The following is a list of flags of entities named or related to Norway.

Kingdom of Norway

National flags

Civil pennant

Royal standards

Flags of the Government

Other flags

Flags of the Military

Flags of the Navy

Flags of the Army
The rank flags are also used by the Air Force and Home Guard.

Flags of the Air Force
The Air Force uses the same rank flags as the Army.

Flags of the Home Guard

Flags of the Coastal Artillery
The now obsolete Coastal artillery of Norway used to have separate rank flags.

Other flags
The Air Force uses the same rank flags as the Army.

Standards of the Army

Army Standards

Home Guard Standards

Former standards

Historical flags
These flags are no longer in use, except the merchant flag of 1821–1844, which was also used from 1899 until the present. Note: The Royal Standard of Norway is seen as the official flag of the Old Kingdom of Norway.

Raven Banner (9th - 11th Century)

Kingdom of Norway (872 - 1397)

Kalmar Union (1397 - 1537)

Denmark-Norway (1537 - 1814)

Kingdom of Norway (1814)

Sweden-Norway (1814 - 1905)

Other flags of Sweden-Norway (1815-1844)

Other flags of Sweden-Norway (1844-1905)

German occupation of Norway

Nasjonal Samling and collaborationists

Party Flags

Rikshirden (Hird of the realm)

Unghirden (Youth Hird)
Unghirden was a branch of the youth organisation specialized for boys between 14 and 18. The flags of Unghirden was also used by the Guttehirden (Boys hird).

NS Ungdomsfylking (Youth organisation)
NS Ungdomsfylking was Nasjonal Samling's youth organisation for children and youth from 10 and 18. The flags of Ungdomsfylking was also used by the Gjentehirden (Girls hird) and the Småhirden (Small hird).

Kvinnehirden (Women's hird)
Kvinnehirden was a branch of the NS Kvinneorganisajonen. Despite being named a Hird, they were not officially part of the hird did not serve any military function, therefore their flags lacked the swords in the sun cross.

Kvinneorganisasjon (Women's organisation)
NS Kvinneorganisasjonen was an organisation for women connected to the party.

Hirdmarinen (Hird Navy)
Hirdmarinen was the Hirden's naval branch meant to form the basis for the future norwegian navy under Quisling's rule.

Nasjonal Samling Labour Service
The NS Labour Service (NS Arbeidstjeneste) was one of the Nasjonal Samling party's special organisations. The Labour Service was meant to combat unemployment in Norway, similar to the German Reich Labour Service.

Flags of other Norwegian collaborationists

Political flags

Subnational flags

Ethnic group flags

Proposed flags of Norway

1814 proposals

1815 proposals

1820 proposals

1821 proposals
In 1821, a flag committee was deducted in the Storting to find a new merchant flag of Norway. 18 Proposals were put forward to be judged by the committee. On May 4th, The Storting discussed and held the vote on what would become the Norwegian flag.

The original documents of 14 of the 18 flag proposals are stored in the Storting Archive. Proposal 4, 5, 9, and 17 are missing.

1836 union flag proposals

Dependent territory proposals

House flags of Norwegian freight companies

See also
Norwegian heraldry
Coat of arms of Norway
Ja, vi elsker dette landet
Kongesangen
History of Norway

References

External links

Norway Army & Air Force Flags Since 1905

Norway
Flags of Norway